Lewis Jon Walker (born 14 April 1999) is an English professional footballer who plays as a forward for League Two side Gillingham.

Club career
Walker started his senior career with Ilkeston before signing for Derby County in January 2016. In January 2017, he went on loan to National League North side Darlington.

On 6 November 2018 Walker signed for the Queens Park Rangers Under 23 team after being released by Derby County earlier in the year. On 13 April 2019 Walker was named as a substitute in the 2018–19 EFL Championship game against Swansea City, he replaced Tomer Hemed in the 83rd minute to make his first team and professional debut. QPR went on to win the game 4–0. On 28 November 2019 Walker signed a short-term loan deal with National League side Aldershot Town. In June 2020, he was released at the end of his contract with QPR.

In September 2020, he went on trial with Italian Serie C club Como. Later in the month, he signed a two-year deal with the Italian club.

On 30 September 2021, he joined newly-formed Athletic Carpi in Serie D.

Walker then returned to England, signing for League Two side Gillingham on 29 July 2022. Walker scored his first goals for the Gills when he scored twice in an EFL Trophy win over Brighton & Hove Albion Under-21s on 5 October 2022.

Personal life
Walker is the son of former England defender Des Walker and younger brother of Portsmouth striker Tyler Walker.

Career statistics

Honours
Como
Serie C winner: 2020–21

References

External links

1999 births
Living people
English footballers
Queens Park Rangers F.C. players
Aldershot Town F.C. players
Association football forwards
Ilkeston F.C. players
Gillingham F.C. players
English Football League players
Como 1907 players
Serie C players
Serie D players
English expatriate footballers
Expatriate footballers in Italy
English expatriate sportspeople in Italy
National League (English football) players